East Dean Park Wood is a  biological Site of Special Scientific Interest south of East Dean in West Sussex.

Dry sheltered woods on chalk downland were once common in the county, but this site is one of the few surviving examples. More than 100 species of woodland plant have been recorded, such as spurge laurel and early-purple orchid. There is a nationally important epiphytic flora, including over 80 lichens and 44 mosses and liverworts.

The site is private land with no public access.

References

Sites of Special Scientific Interest in West Sussex
Forests and woodlands of West Sussex